Stylidium mitrasacmoides is a taxonomic synonym that has been applied to the following species:

 Stylidium nominatum - Stylidium mitrasacmoides is an illegitimate name applied to this species and was described in 1979, later being renamed to avoid the earlier usage.
 Stylidium tenerrimum - Stylidium mitrasacmoides is a valid synonym of this species and was described by Ferdinand von Mueller in 1859.

Stylidium by synonymy